Thomas Dickel (31 July 1897 – 18 February 1969) was a New Zealand cricketer. He played one first-class match for Otago in 1917/18.

Dickel was born at Dunedin in 1897. He worked as a traffic inspector.

References

External links
 

1897 births
1969 deaths
New Zealand cricketers
Otago cricketers
Cricketers from Dunedin